Kharaf Kam (also Romanized as Kharaf Kām, Kharfakām, and Kharfkām; also known as Kharfeh Kām, Kharfekām, and Kherfakan) is a village in Kasma Rural District, in the Central District of Sowme'eh Sara County, Gilan Province, Iran. At the 2006 census, its population was 77, in 20 families.

References 

Populated places in Sowme'eh Sara County